Abigail Tordoff (born 18 July 1979) is a British former professional tennis player.

Biography
A former top 50 junior, Tordoff reached a best singles ranking of 242 on the professional tour, playing mostly on the ITF circuit. She also featured in several WTA Tour qualifying draws and at Pattaya in 1997 made it into the main draw of the doubles, with Yi Jing-qian. At the 1999 Wimbledon Championships she appeared in the singles main draw as a wildcard and was beaten in the first round by Elena Wagner. She retired from tennis in 2000.

Tordoff, who previously worked as a sports agent, is the CEO of tennis charity Give It Your Max, which holds in-school tennis programmes.

ITF finals

Singles (1–3)

Doubles (1–1)

References

External links
 
 

1979 births
Living people
British female tennis players
English female tennis players
Female tennis players playing padel